Wouter Dronkers (born 3 May 1993) is a Dutch professional footballer who currently plays as a goalkeeper for Boston City FC in the National Premier Soccer League. Besides his athletic career, Dronkers is studying medicine.

Club career
After spells with SV Excellence, CVV Willemstad and PH Almelo, Dronkers joined Twente in 2003. On 6 December 2012, Dronkers was named on the bench to face Helsingborgs IF in Twente's UEFA Europa League group stage tie, remaining unused in the 3–1 defeat at De Grolsch Veste. On 9 September 2013, Dronkers made his debut for the Jong Twente side, in their 2–0 away defeat against FC Eindhoven.

After failing to make a breakthrough at Twente, Dronkers joined fellow Eredivisie side Vitesse in August 2014. On 15 December 2016, it was announced that Dronkers would leave Vitesse at the end of the 2016–17 campaign to study at Harvard University in the United States. On 4 March 2017, Dronkers was named as an unused substitute in Vitesse's 3–1 away defeat against PEC Zwolle.

On 29 March 2018, it was announced that Dronkers joined Boston City FC for the 2018 season. Between his release from Vitesse and signing for Boston City FC, Dronkers played along the side of Harvard Club Soccer, at Harvard University. He wishes to become a neurosurgeon.

References

External links
 Wouter Dronkers Interview

1993 births
Living people
People from Vlaardingen
Association football goalkeepers
Dutch footballers
Eerste Divisie players
FC Twente players
SBV Vitesse players
C.V.V. Inter Willemstad players
Boston City FC players
Dutch expatriate footballers
Dutch expatriate sportspeople in the United States
Expatriate soccer players in the United States
Footballers from South Holland
Jong FC Twente players